Mahbod Moghadam is an American internet entrepreneur. In 2009 he, Tom Lehman and Ilan Zechory co-founded Rap Genius (now Genius), a website on which users can submit annotations and interpretations of song lyrics and other content. In 2015 he co-founded Everipedia, a wiki-based online encyclopedia, where he worked as the Chief Community Officer for several years. He is now an Entrepreneur-in-Residence at the venture capital firm Mucker Capital. In 2021 he launched Hella Doge, a social network that gives users Dogecoin for posting and for seeing ads.

Personal life and education
Moghadam was born to an Iranian Jewish family and grew up in Encino, California. He graduated from Yale University in 2004 with a major in History and International Studies. In 2005, he went to France on a Fulbright scholarship. When he returned in 2005, he enrolled at Stanford Law School, and graduated in 2008 with a J.D.

Moghadam is known for his "outlandish" personality and behavior. In 2013 he received media attention for telling Mark Zuckerberg in an interview and Warren Buffett in a tweet to "suck [his] dick", and for his later public apology to them during an onstage appearance at the TechCrunch Disrupt New York conference. He later attributed some of his behavior to a benign brain tumor that was discovered and removed in 2013. 

In August 2018, Moghadam appeared as a guest on Sacha Baron Cohen's television series Who is America?, in which Cohen adopted various disguises and personas to capture his guests behaving in embarrassing ways. Believing he was doing a photoshoot with a "playboy photographer" named Gio, Moghadam is shown making the Bloods gang sign and imitating shooting a gun when Cohen asks him to "do something like a black guy." Later Cohen has him pose in front of a green screen so he could later be photoshopped into scenes as though he is feeding starving children.  

In September 2018, Moghadam had an epileptic seizure attributable to a second brain tumor, and had brain surgery later that month.

Career
After graduating from law school in 2008, Moghadam became an attorney at the law firm of Dewey & LeBoeuf. In 2009, many law offices who were trying to endure the Great Recession placed junior employees on "deferral", paying them a partial salary to take time off and encouraging them to intern at other companies. While on deferral from Dewey & LeBoeuf, Moghadam was hired as an intern at Berkshire Hathaway in Omaha, Nebraska. However, shortly before departing for his internship, the internship offer was rescinded and he was fired by Dewey & LeBeouf when a Berkshire Hathaway employee discovered a satirical memo he had written and published on his blog, addressed to "Ballstate Insurance Company" (a reference to the Allstate insurance company, which was a client of Dewey & LeBoeuf).

In August 2009, Moghadam and Tom Lehman founded Rap Genius, a website that initially allowed users to annotate and interpret song lyrics. Moghadam was included in the 2013 Forbes 30 Under 30 list along with the other Rap Genius cofounders. In 2014, Rap Genius rebranded to Genius and expanded to support annotations for news stories, poetry, and other documents. Moghadam resigned from Genius that same year after receiving negative media attention when he used Genius to add annotations to the manifesto written by the perpetrator of the 2014 Isla Vista killings, which he described as "beautifully written". His comments were described by CNN as "tasteless and creepy", and Genius co-founder Lehman said in a statement that the annotations "not only didn't attempt to enhance anyone's understanding of the text, but went beyond that into gleeful insensitivity and misogyny."

In 2015, Moghadam met Sam Kazemian and joined him as co-founder and Chief Community Officer of Everipedia, a wiki-based online encyclopedia. Everipedia raised $30M from Galaxy Digital to build a competitor of Wikipedia on the EOS blockchain. The investment came together through a conversation between Moghadam and Bitcoin Foundation chairman Brock Pierce. After leaving Everipedia, Moghadam began working at venture capital firm Mucker Capital.

References

External links 
 

1982 births
American technology company founders
American technology executives
American venture capitalists
American people of Iranian descent
Living people
Stanford Law School alumni
Yale University alumni